West Bengal University of Teachers' Training, Education Planning and Administration  (WBUTTEPA) was established by an Act of the West Bengal legislature published in the Kolkata Gazette, Extraordinary, 16 January 2015. This is the first university in India set up by any State Government exclusively for training teachers. The university was established in 2015 and Prof. Mita Banerjee became the first Vice Chancellor. It offers different teacher's training courses (B.Ed. and M.Ed.) at the undergraduate and postgraduate level. The courses are approved by NCTE. It has 200 teachers' training colleges affiliated to its jurisdiction and its horizon encompasses the entire state of West Bengal.

On 27 June 2022, Govt of West Bengal changed The present name of the university from WBUTTEP&A to Baba Saheb Ambedkar Education University

References

External links
https://www.wbuttepa.ac.in/

Educational institutions established in 2015
Universities and colleges in Kolkata
2015 establishments in West Bengal